Archbishop Vartan Kechichian, C.A.M. (13 September 1933 – 22 November 2017) was a Syrian-born Armenian Catholic hierarch. He served as a Titular Archbishop of Mardin for Armenians and Coadjutor Ordinary of Ordinariate for Catholics of Armenian Rite in Eastern Europe from 17 February 2001 until his retirement on 2 April 2005.

Life
Archbishop Kechichian was born in the Armenian family in diaspora, in Syria. After the school graduation, he subsequently joined the Order of the Mechitarists in Venice, where he made a solemn profession on August 15, 1956. He was ordained as priest on September 8, 1959, after studies in the Pontifical Gregorian University, Italy (1953–1959) with a licentiate in philosophy and theology.

After his ordination to priesthood, he served in the different Mechitarists institutions in Italy, Lebanon, France, Argentina and Syria and in the same time made a pastoral work for the Armenian Catholics. Also from 1997 until 2000 he served as an Abbot Primate of Mekhitarists.

On February 17, 2001 Vardapet Kechichian was nominated by Pope John Paul II and on May 13, 2001 consecrated to the Episcopate as a Coadjutor Ordinary. The principal consecrator was Patriarch Nerses Bedros XIX Tarmouni, the Head of the Armenian Catholic Church.

Archbishop Kechichian retired from office, before reaching the age limit. He died on November 22, 2017 at age 84.

References

1933 births
2017 deaths
People from Kessab
Mekhitarists
Pontifical Gregorian University alumni
Armenian Catholic bishops
Syrian people of Armenian descent
21st-century Eastern Catholic bishops
Kechichian family